Six ships of the Royal Navy, have been named HMS Leander after the Greek hero Leander:

 was a 52-gun fourth rate launched in 1780. She was captured by the French in 1798, but was recaptured by the Russians in 1799 and returned. She was renamed HMS Hygeia in 1813 while being used as a medical depot, and was sold in 1817.
 was a 58-gun fourth rate launched in 1813 and broken up in 1830.
 was a 50-gun fourth rate launched in 1848. She was converted to screw propulsion in 1861 and was sold in 1867.
 was a  protected cruiser launched in 1882. She became a depot ship in 1904 and was sold in 1920.
HMS Leander (1931) was a  light cruiser launched in 1931. She was transferred to the New Zealand Navy in 1937, returned in 1945 and scrapped in 1949.
 was a  launched in 1961 and expended as a target in 1989.

Battle honours
Ships named Leander have earned the following battle honours:
Nile 1798
Algiers 1816
Crimea 1854–55
Kula Gulf 1943

See also
 TS Leander, a New Zealand Sea Cadet Corps unit
 , a number of civil ships with this name

Royal Navy ship names